The 1972 Virginia Slims of Newport, was a women's tennis tournament played on outdoor grass courts at the Newport Casino in Newport, Rhode Island in the United States that was part of the 1972 Virginia Slims World Championship Series. It was the second edition of the tournament and was held from August 22 through August 26, 1972. Sixth-seeded Margaret Court won the singles title and earned $3,400 first-prize money.

Finals

Singles
 Margaret Court defeated  Billie Jean King 6–4, 6–1

Doubles
 Margaret Court /  Lesley Hunt defeated  Rosemary Casals /  Billie Jean King 6–2, 6–2

Prize money

References

Virginia Slims of Newport
Virginia Slims of Newport
1972 in sports in Rhode Island
August 1972 sports events in the United States